Salaberry may refer to:

Hugo Manuel Salaberry Goyeneche (born 1952), prelate of the Roman Catholic Church
Charles de Salaberry, CB (1778–1829), Canadian military officer and statesman of the seigneurial class
Charles-René-Léonidas d'Irumberry de Salaberry (1820–1882), French-Canadian militia officer and civil servant
Enrique Cahen Salaberry (1911–1991), prolific Argentine film director
Horacio Salaberry (born 1987), Uruguayan footballer
Ignace-Michel-Louis-Antoine d'Irumberry de Salaberry (1752–1828), Member of the Legislative Assembly of Lower Canada
Juan Daniel Salaberry (born 1980), Uruguayan footballer
Melchior-Alphonse de Salaberry (1813–1867), Canadien lawyer and political figure
Michel de Salaberry (1704–1768), Basque naval officer and a shipowner who migrated to Quebec
Rafael Díaz Aguado Salaberry (1870–1942), Spanish Carlist politician
Zilka Salaberry (born 1917), Brazilian actress who appeared in a variety of telenovelas

See also
Salaberry-de-Valleyfield, city in southwestern Quebec
Rural Municipality of De Salaberry, rural municipality in the province of Manitoba in Western Canada
Salbari
Seliberia
Syllabary